Józef Łęczycki was a Polish architect. His work was part of the architecture event in the art competition at the 1928 Summer Olympics.

References

External links

Year of birth missing
Year of death missing
20th-century Polish architects
Olympic competitors in art competitions
Place of birth missing